Permai Education Foundation ( is a private education institution founded in 1979 by Laviana Kurniawan who wished to improve the quality of education. 

YPP manages schools such as: 
 Permai (Preschool - Primary - Secondary – Senior High School) with National curriculum.
 Permai Plus (Nursery - Kindergarten - Primary -Secondary) with National Plus curriculum.

YPP history
On 1 May 1979, a playgroup was opened in a house located at Pluit Permai V/7, North Jakarta. The playgroup was moved to a new building at Pluit Utara No.2 along with the opening of Pre-school in July 1980. Primary was opened in 1981. YPP provided a new building in 1984/1985 at Pluit Samudera Raya No. 9 for Secondary and Senior High School. Since July 1993 until now, the school has occupied a 1600 m2 at Jl. Pluit Karang Barat Blok O-VI, Pluit, Penjaringan, North Jakarta. In The academic year 2005/2006 the Foundation opened Permai Plus School to face the era of globalization.

YPP philosophy
 To accommodate every pupil’s right to choose his/her belief
 The success of creating intelligent individuals is the result of hard work and effort
 The character building of each pupil must be initialized since early childhood

Logo of the school
Thematic meaning of the school’s logo:
 Star (yellow) with five angles means a star that always shines for the progress of national education and highly respects Pancasila
 The word Sekolah (red) and Permai (white) mean First Rate in education quality; Excellent in service; Realistic in facing global challenges; Appreciate life, ethical, and moral values; Top in creation and innovation; Inspiration for the next generation.
 YPP: Y(yellow), P(yellow), P(red) is an acronym of Yayasan Pendidikan Permai.
 Grains (yellow, 17 grains of rice) and cotton (green, white, 8 pieces) symbolize high appreciation to freedom, loyalty, prosperity, and justice in implementing national education.
 Shield-shaped frame (white) means as a firm protector and a unity of all aspects.
 Colours in the logo are red that symbolizes courage and strength, white symbolizes love, green symbolizes hope, yellow symbolizes prosperity and wisdom, and blue symbolizes reliance.

Facilities
YPP provides main facilities such as:

Building. YPP has two buildings; the old building for Permai School (Pre-school – Primary – Secondary – Senior High School) and the new building for Permai Plus School (Nursery – Kindergarten – Primary - Secondary). All rooms are equipped by air-conditioners included Physics and Chemistry/Biology laboratories. 

Laboratory. There are Biology and Chemistry laboratory (combined), Language laboratory, Physics laboratory, and Computer laboratory in the school. There is also a particular place for hydroponics. 

Library. There are three libraries in YPP which are main library, Permai Pre-school library, and Permai Plus School library. There are various kinds of books, newspapers, magazines and several computers with internet access in the main library. 

Audio-visual. Audio Visual Room is equipped with a laptop, an LCD projector, a multimedia player and a 42 inch television.

Sports facilities. There are a basketball courtyard, futsal field, badminton courtyard, and tennis courtyard in YPP. Here is also a special room for table tennis. There are a mini swimming pool, a playroom, and a playground particularly for Permai Preschool. 

Hall. This large room is utilized for special occasions such as art performances, seminars, graduation ceremonies, etc. 

Cafetaria. There are two special places for eating and gathering.

Organizational structure
 Founder : Laviana Kurniawan
 Superintendent : Jungestu Nuralam
 Chairman : Djoko Wihardjo
 Secretary : Darwis Hartono
 Treasurer : Henny Kusumo
 Head of Pre-school : Indah
 Head of Primary : Asteria Maria Sudarwati
 Head of Secondary : Anne Maria
 Head of Senior High School : Robertus Kusnandar
 Head of Permai Plus : William Chandra

External links
 Official website of Permai School

 
Schools in Indonesia
Educational institutions established in 1979
1979 establishments in Indonesia